Bosson Kablan Romaric (born 12 April 1988), simply Romaric, is an Ivorian footballer who plays for C.D. Aves as a defender.

Career

References

1988 births
Living people
Ivorian footballers
Association football defenders
Ivorian expatriate sportspeople in Portugal
Ivorian expatriate footballers
Footballers from Abidjan
Stella Club d'Adjamé players
G.D. Chaves players
S.C. Freamunde players
C.D. Aves players